Kritarchy, also called kritocracy, was the system of rule by Biblical judges in ancient Israel, started by Moses according to the Book of Exodus, before the establishment of a united monarchy under Saul.

The word "jurocracy" has also been used by others.

Definitions

Contrast to extant system 

Sachs and others rejected the idea that the Constitutional Court of South Africa, on which he sat, was a dikastocracy; using the name to denote what they asserted the Court not to be. It was used in a 1996 Court opinion that rejected the "horizontal" application (between citizens as opposed to "vertical" application between citizens and the government) of the RSA constitution's Bill of Rights and warned that "horizontal" application would turn the republic into such a dikastocracy.

Others have similarly used this as an inverse definition to denote what they assert their form of government is not. Supreme Court of the United States justice Stanley Forman Reed, the last dissenter to be convinced in the decision on Brown v. Board of Education used kritarchy as the name for the judicial activism that he initially dissented from, asking his clerk (John Fassett) who argued with the direction to write a dissenting opinion whether he (Fassett) favoured a kritarchy. Fassett was unfamiliar with the word, and Reed told him to look it up. Fassett could not find it in several dictionaries, finally locating it in the Oxford English Dictionary.

According to van Notten 
This form of rule (in the non-Biblical sense) is the case of Somalia, ruled by judges with the polycentric legal tradition of xeer. The definition employed by Michael van Notten (based upon one by Frank van Dun) is not, strictly, that of rule by judges, judges not being a formal political class but rather people selected at random to perform that task ad hoc; but rather is that of a legal and political system whose closest analogue in other societies is that of a system based entirely upon customary rather than statutory law. Ayittey referred to this as a "near-Kritarchy". Van Notten himself argues that with few exceptions, the system of government which he denotes a kritarchy is "harmonious with the concept of natural law" and "very close to what in philosophy might be called 'the natural order of human beings'".

Potential kritarchies 

Many legal scholars and commentators have spoken of the potential for systems to move to a form of kritarchy, viewing such in a negative light. A specific example is the Constitution of the Philippines which allows for direct rule by the Supreme Court should the Executive commit a "grave abuse", which is not defined in law.

Historical examples 

Ireland had a system of kritarchy from the 5th century BCE to the 5th century CE under the Brehon Law, the Brehons being the class of Druid Judges. A kritarchy system was also present in medieval Ireland until the 13th century.

The Icelandic Commonwealth between the 9th and 13th century has been labelled as a kritarchy by David D. Friedman and Einar Olgeirsson.

The Sardinian medieval kingdoms, also called the Judicates, from the 10th to 14th centuries.

Frisia, at the end of the Frisian freedom, in the 16th century had a system of kritarchy.

Islamic Courts Union from 1994 to 2006 in Somalia, following the legal system of xeer.

In popular culture 
 The fictional regime of Mega-city One, the focus of setting for the Judge Dredd franchise, can be described as a kritarchy.

References

Reference bibliography 

 
 
 
 
 
 
 
 
 
 
 
 
 
 
 
 
 
 
 
 
 
 
 
 
 
 
 
 

Oligarchy
Ancient Israel and Judah
Religion and politics